Wild Canada is a Canadian documentary television miniseries, which aired in 2014 on CBC Television as part of its The Nature of Things series. Created by documentarians Jeff and Sue Turner, the series profiles the natural environment of Canada through high-definition video footage. The Turners were both contributors to the similar BBC series Planet Earth and Frozen Planet.

The series garnered several Canadian Screen Award nominations at the 3rd Canadian Screen Awards, including Best Nature or Nature Documentary Program or Series, Best Direction in a Documentary or Factual Series, Best Photography in a Documentary Program or Factual Series and Best Original Music for a Non-Fiction Program or Series, and its companion digital media application for smartphones and tablets was nominated for Best Cross-Platform Project, Non-Fiction. Jeff Turner won the award for Best Direction in a Documentary or Factual Series, for the episode "The Eternal Frontier".

Episodes

References

External links

 

2014 Canadian television series debuts
2010s Canadian television miniseries
2010s Canadian documentary television series
CBC Television original programming